Ulyanovsk Oblast (Ul’janovskaja oblast’) is a federal subject of Russia (an oblast). It is located in the Volga Federal District. Its administrative center is the city of Ulyanovsk. It has a population of 1,292,799 (2010 Census).

Geography

Ulyanovsk Oblast borders with Chuvashia (N), Tatarstan (NE), Samara Oblast (E), Saratov Oblast (S), Penza Oblast (W), and Mordovia (NW).

It is located on the northern edge of Central Steppes. A quarter of its territory is covered with deciduous forests; the rest is covered with steppes and meadows. The oblast is divided in half by the Volga River. Hilly areas to the west of the Volga are known as Volga Upland (elevations up to 358 m (1,175 ft) ). Eastern part of the oblast is mostly flat. The water table occupies about 6% of territory. 

Ulyanovsk Oblast has moderately continental, highly volatile climate. Temperature averages at +19 °C (66 °F) in July, and −11 °C (12 °F) in January. As weather systems move in and out of the area, average daily temperatures often change more than +25 °C (77 °F) in the matter of days. Fixed snow cover is typically present from November to the beginning of April. Overnight frosts occur until late May, restricting agriculture to cold-resistant plants such as rye and winter wheat. Annual precipitation drops out 400 mm (16 inches) a year.

Nature

Ulyanovsk Oblast is located in the zones of wooded plain and broad-leaved scaffolding.

Soils are predominantly chernozem.

Forests occupy 1/4 territories. In the northwest — large massifs of oak forest with the participation of linden, maple; in the Transvolga region — meadow steppes, separate pine borons.

The area is inhabited by moose, marten, squirrel, hare (white and other) as well as numerous planktonic and marshy- coastal birds. Kuybyshev Reservoir  is home to fish such as bream, pike-perch, carp and others. Ulyanovsk Oblast also has a concentrated wasp population.

The protected areas are found on the territory of region: national park Sengiley Mountains, the guarding zone of state preserve “Volga wooded plain”, the monuments of nature Undory mineral source, relict forests etc.

History

The first settlements of Middle Volga people were established in this area of Volga more than 100,000 years ago, according to archaeological science. The presence of human groups in the Ulyanovsk Volga region in the Paleolithic show separate parking and location of stone tools and bones found in the estuary. Cheremshan Tunguz on the peninsula, on the shores of the Volga in the region of Undory resort.

In the 8th and 9th centuries Ulyanovsk Volga region became a part of the early Volga Bulgaria, as a union of nomadic Turkic and sedentary Finno-Ugric tribes.

In the late 14th and early 15th century, the devastating Central Asian ruler Tamerlane began desolation territory of the Volga Ulyanovsk. Since the late 1430s the region was a part of the Kazan Khanate. After the pacification of the territory of the future of his governorship Simbirsk gradually settled by Ruthenians, who mingled with the local Tatars.

In the late 1640s, under the leadership
of Bogdan Hitrovo, construction of the Karsunsky-Simbirsk defense line began (1647-1654 biennium).

Twenty-two years after its founding, the city of Simbirsk had to withstand a siege of the Cossacks, led by Ataman Stepan Razin.

In the 18th century in connection with the expansion of the territory of the Russian state, in particular, to the east, and began to develop intensively populated southern regions of the present territory of the Ulyanovsk region. Simbirsk began to lose its status of strategic military importance, but remained the provincial center.

Russian revolution

The Bolsheviks took power in Simbirsk one and a half month after the October Revolution—December 10, 1917. In 1918, the province was at the heart of the  civil war. In July 1918 Simbirsk was captured by troops of the Komuch army led by White Russian tsarist General Vladimir Kappel. But on September 12 the Bolsheviks recaptured the city, resulting in the restoration of communism. The Red Army victory was led by the "Iron Division". Simbirsk was the headquarters of the Revolutionary Military Council of the eastern front. The ammunition factory in Simbirsk was essential to ensuring the Red Army victory.

In 1924 Simbirsk was renamed Ulyanovsk. On May 14, 1928 the Ulyanovsk Governorate of the RSFSR was abolished. The Province, together with Penza, Samara and Orenburg became part of the newly formed Middle Volga region.

World War II

Since the beginning of the Great Patriotic War in Ulyanovsk, being the rear, the evacuated enterprises, institutions and people from the western regions of the country, from Moscow and Leningrad. January 19, 1943 from several districts of Kuybyshev and Penza Oblasts formed Ulyanovsk Oblast.

Post-war development
In the 1950 and 1960s, new enterprises were created in the region (factory of heavy and unique machines, mechanical plant, Dimitrovgrad Research Institute of Atomic Reactors, etc.), and infrastructure was built, including aroad bridge over the Volga River and Ulyanovsk Airport. In 1970, the then General Secretary of the Communist Party of the Soviet Union Leonid Brezhnev, inaugurated memorial museum of Lenin. On 30 October 1997, Ulyanovsk, alongside Astrakhan, Kirov, Murmansk, and Yaroslavl signed a power-sharing agreement with the government of Russia, granting it autonomy. The agreement was abolished on 31 December 2001.

Politics

During the Soviet period, the high authority in the oblast was shared between three persons: The first secretary of the Ulyanovsk CPSU Committee (who in reality had the biggest authority), the chairman of the oblast Soviet (legislative power), and the Chairman of the oblast Executive Committee (executive power). Since 1991, CPSU lost all the power, and the head of the Oblast administration, and eventually the governor was appointed/elected alongside elected regional parliament.

The Charter of Ulyanovsk Oblast is the fundamental law of the region. The Legislative Assembly of Ulyanovsk Oblast is the province's standing legislative (representative) body. The Legislative Assembly exercises its authority by passing laws, resolutions, and other legal acts and by supervising the implementation and observance of the laws and other legal acts passed by it. The highest executive body is the Oblast Administration, which includes territorial executive bodies such as district administrations, committees, and commissions that facilitate development and run the day to day matters of the province. The Oblast administration supports the activities of the Governor who is the highest official and acts as guarantor of the observance of the oblast Charter in accordance with the Constitution of Russia.

Administrative divisions

Demographics

Population: 

55% of residents of Ulyanovsk Oblast live in two cities with population above 25,000—Ulyanovsk and Dimitrovgrad.

The ethnic composition is as follows:
73.6% Russian
12.2% Tatar
7.7% Chuvash
3.2% Mordva
3.3% others
67,890 people were registered from administrative databases, and could not declare an ethnicity. It is estimated that the proportion of ethnicities in this group is the same as that of the declared group.

For the first half of 2007, the birth rate was 9.0 per 1000  The area population is reduced and for 20 years since 1991 has decreased on 200 thousand persons.

Total fertility rate:
2009 - 1.40 | 2010 - 1.41 | 2011 - 1.45 | 2012 - 1.57 | 2013 - 1.61 | 2014 - 1.67 | 2015 - 1.71 | 2016 - 1.71(e)

Religion

Education

Ulyanovsk State University, established in 1988 as a branch of Moscow State University. At the present time, UlSU is one of the largest higher educational institutions in the Volga region, comprising 6 institutes, 6 independent faculties, 2 affiliates, 5 junior colleges, 6 learning centers. UlSU enrolls about 15 thousand students annually, among them 125 foreign citizens from 20 countries of the world.
Ulyanovsk State Technical University, established in 1957 as Ulyanovsk Polytech University. Today Ulyanovsk State Technical University features over 14,000 students on different education programs at 10 faculties and 48 departments.
Ulyanovsk State Pedagogical University, established in 1932.
Ulyanovsk State Agricultural Academy, established in 1943.
Ulyanovsk Higher Civil Aviation School, founded in 1935 as a training center, designed for training and retraining of flight crews of civil aircraft. In 1992, raised its status to the present. Has branches in Krasny Kut, Saratov Oblast and Sasovo, Ryazan Oblast. When it has Main industry museum of civil aviation history (Ulyanovsk aircraft museum), established in 1983.

There is also a number of technical and medical colleges in Ulyanovsk.

Economy

Ulyanovsk Oblast is part of the Volga economic region.

Ulyanovsk Oblast has an abundance of land, water, forest, and mineral resources. Ulyanovsk Region also has substantial reserves of other raw materials used in industry, such as various kinds of sand, cement materials, clays, and peat. One of the largest quartz sand deposits in the CIS, the Tashlinskoe deposit, is located in the region.

Ulyanovsk and Dimitrovgrad are industrial cities and contain a number of large plants and factories. Rural part of Ulyanovsk Oblast is agricultural and is focused primarily on animal husbandry, to the lesser extent on crop farming. There are two resorts in Ulyanovsk Oblast territory  - "Bely Yar" and "Dubki".

City of Ulyanovsk is a major, diversified, industrial hub for aircraft and auto industries.

The UAZ automobile manufacturing plant, now a subsidiary of Sollers JSC;  Aviastar-SP Aircraft Company, now a part of United Aircraft Corporation;  Scientific and Production Association "Mars" (manufactures industrial control systems for the Russian Navy), now part of state-owned conglomerate Agat; Ulyanovsk Cartridge Works (manufactures ammunition for firearms); Ulyanovsk Motor Plant (russian.Ульяновский моторный завод, UMZ) and Ulyanovsk Mechanical Plant (russian.Ульяновский механический завод, UMZ, subsidiary of JSC Almaz-Antey) are based in the city along with a variety of light industry and food-processing enterprises. Other developed sectors include the flour-milling, meat, butter-making, starch and molasses, distilling, building material, and woodworking industries.

In addition, a global, international airline for unique and heavy cargo , Volga-Dnepr Airlines is based in the city too.

There are many manufacturing facilities of foreign corporations such as Legrand (company), Mars, Incorporated, Takata-Petri, Anadolu Efes S.K., ALFA (Mexico) and others.

Banking is mostly represented by national banks such as Sberbank, VTB Bank, Alfa-Bank, Bin Bank, Ak Bars Bank, MDM Bank, Trust Bank and also regional banks from Ulyanovsk Oblast.

Ulyanovsk has also a strong military base presence in town. The 31st Airborne Brigade of the Russian Airborne Troops of the armed forces is based in Ulyanovsk.

Tourism and Hospitality Industry

Tourism is a growing industry in this region because of Volga micro-climate and historical significance of Simbirsk. Hilton Hotel Group and Marriott Hotels & Resorts are building their hotels in the downtown area.

The region of Undory, a driving distance from Ulyanovsk is famous for its spas and mineral water. The city offers many options for sports enthusiasts. The countryside is ideal for outdoor and water sports. The springs of Undory have been known for more than 200 years. The water at spa is rich in sodium chloride, and comes from artesian wells.

Retail and Restaurants
Retail is a growing business segment in Ulyanovsk Region. International retailers such as Auchan SA, METRO AG, Media Markt, Decathlon as well as local  Russian chains such as X5 Retail, Magnit, Lenta (retail), Sportmaster, M.video opened up their stores in Ulyanovsk.

Aqua Mall is an American-type mall concept that opened in Ulyanovsk on the banks of Sviyaga river with modern cinema theater, IMAX. The city has also a large presence of international fast food brands such as McDonald's, Burger King, Baskin Robbins, Sbarro, KFC and others. Local Russian brands are also well-represented in this market.

Regional automobile code is 73. Ulyanovsk has 2 airports.

Sports

Bandy is traditionally the most popular sport in Ulyanovsk Oblast.Volga plays in the Russian Bandy Super League. The other club Simbirsk plays in the 2nd division. An indoor arena for bandy, Volga-Sport-Arena, has been built, as one of the first in Russia. It has a capacity of 5 000. The outdoor stadium will be modernised and have a capacity of 18 000. The 2016 Bandy World Championship is being played in Ulyanovsk. and Dimitrovgrad.

In association football, FC Volga plays in "Urals-Volga" zone of the Russian Second Division.

Ulyanovsk also hosted matches of  first qualifying round UEFA Women's Under-17 Championship 2014. Matches were held at "Trud" Football Stadium in the downtown Ulyanovsk.

Overall sports get a lot of support from the Ulyanovsk Oblast government.

Sister relationships
 Nghệ An Province, Vietnam

See also
List of Chairmen of the Ulyanovsk Oblast Duma

References

Notes

Sources

External links

 

 

 
States and territories established in 1943